The Waldseemüller map or Universalis Cosmographia ("Universal Cosmography") is a printed wall map of the world by German cartographer Martin Waldseemüller, originally published in April 1507. It is known as the first map to use the name "America". The name America is placed on South America on the main map. As explained in Cosmographiae Introductio, the name was bestowed in honor of the Italian Amerigo Vespucci.

The map is drafted on a modification of Ptolemy's second projection, expanded to accommodate the Americas and the high latitudes. A single copy of the map survives, presently housed at the Library of Congress in Washington, D.C.

Waldseemüller also created globe gores, printed maps designed to be cut out and pasted onto spheres to form globes of the Earth. The wall map, and his globe gores of the same date, depict the American continents in two pieces. These depictions differ from the small inset map in the top border of the wall map, which shows the two American continents joined by an isthmus.

Wall map

Description
The map was meant to document and update new geographical knowledge from the discoveries of the late fifteenth and the first years of the sixteenth centuries. Each section is one of four horizontally and three vertically, when assembled. The map uses a modified Ptolemaic map projection with curved meridians to depict the entire surface of the Earth. In the upper-mid part of the main map there is inset another, miniature world map representing to some extent an alternative view of the world.

Longitudes, which were difficult to determine at the time, are given in terms of degrees east from the Fortunate Islands (considered by Claudius Ptolemy as the westernmost known land) which Waldseemüller locates at the Canary Islands. The longitudes of eastern Asian places are too great. Latitudes, which were easy to determine, are also quite far off. For example, "Serraleona" (Sierra Leone, true latitude about 9°N) is placed south of the equator, and the Cape of Good Hope (true latitude 35°S) is placed at 50°S.

The full title of the map is Universalis cosmographia secundum Ptholomaei traditionem et Americi Vespucii aliorumque lustrationes (The Universal Cosmography according to the Tradition of Ptolemy and the Discoveries of Amerigo Vespucci and others). One of the others was Christopher Columbus. The title signalled his intention to combine or harmonize in a unified cosmographic depiction the traditional Ptolemaic geography of Europe, Asia and Africa with the new geographical information provided by Amerigo Vespucci and his fellow discoverers of lands in the western hemisphere. He explained: "In designing the sheets of our world-map we have not followed Ptolemy in every respect, particularly as regards the new lands ... We have therefore followed, on the flat map, Ptolemy, except for the new lands and some other things, but on the solid globe, which accompanies the flat map, the description of Amerigo that is appended hereto."

Several earlier maps are believed to be sources, chiefly those based on the Geography (Ptolemy) and the Caveri planisphere and others similar to those of Henricus Martellus or Martin Behaim. The Caribbean and what appears to be Florida were depicted on two earlier charts, the Cantino map, smuggled from Portugal to Italy in 1502 showing details known in 1500, and the Caverio map, drawn circa 1503–1506 and showing the Gulf of Mexico.

While some maps after 1500 show, with ambiguity, an eastern coastline for Asia distinct from the Americas, the Waldseemüller map apparently indicates the existence of a new ocean between the trans-Atlantic regions of the Spanish discoveries and the Asia of Ptolemy and Marco Polo as exhibited on the 1492 Behaim globe. The first historical records of Europeans to set eyes on this ocean, the Pacific, are recorded as Vasco Núñez de Balboa in 1513. That is five to six years after Waldseemüller made his map. In addition, the map apparently predicts the width of South America at certain latitudes to within 70 miles. However, as pointed out by E.G. Ravenstein, this is an illusory effect of the cordiform projection used by Waldseemüller, for when the map is laid out on a more familiar equirectangular projection and compared with others of the period also set out on that same projection there is little difference between them: this is particularly evident when the comparison is made with Johannes Schöner's 1515 globe.

Apparently among most map-makers until that time, it was still erroneously believed that the lands discovered by Christopher Columbus, Vespucci, and others formed part of the Indies of Asia. Amerigo Vespucci said: "After we sailed ca. 400 leagues along the coast without interruption, we concluded that this is mainland, by which I mean that it forms the easternmost point of Asia and the first tip of Asia reached when sailing westbound". On his 1506 world map, Giovanni Contarini called the land later called America by  Waldseemüller the Antipodes.

Waldseemüller drew upon the 1506 world map of Nicolaus de Caverio, where an inscription off the coast of vera cruz (America/Brazil) says: "The land called Vera Cruz was found by Pedro Alvares Cabral, a gentleman of the household of the King of Portugal. He discovered it as commander of a fleet of 14 ships that that King sent to Calicut, and on the way to India, he came across this land here, which he took to be terra firma [mainland] in which there are many people, described as going about, men and women, as naked as their mothers bore them; they are lighter-skinned." They judged that this was mainland because they ran along the coast more than two thousand miles but did not find the end of it". Caverio's inscription was copied by Waldseemüller and placed in the same location on his map, with the significant difference that, although Cabral and his companions believed that they had reached "the mainland", i.e. part of Asia, Waldseemüller, for unexplained reasons, asserted in the inscription on his map concerning America that it was "an enormous sea-girt island of yet unknown size" [i.e. not part of Asia].

Some believe that it is impossible that Waldseemüller could have known about the Pacific, which is depicted on his map. The historian Peter Whitfield has theorized that Waldseemüller incorporated the ocean into his map because Vespucci's accounts of the Americas, with their so-called "savage" peoples, could not be reconciled with contemporary knowledge of India, China, and the islands of Indies. Thus, in the view of Whitfield, Waldseemüller reasoned that the newly discovered lands could not be part of Asia, but must be separate from it, a leap of intuition that was later proved uncannily precise. An alternative explanation is that of George E. Nunn (see below). Chet Van Duzer has said that the explanation for the depiction of the Ocean to the west of America is that Marco Polo had stated that Zipangu (Japan) was an island, so that there had to be sea between it and America, which Waldseemüller had concluded was also an island.

Mundus Novus, a book attributed to Vespucci (who had himself explored the extensive eastern coast of South America), was widely published throughout Europe after 1504, including a version by Waldseemüller's group in 1507 under the title, Quatuor Americi Vespucii Navigationes. It expressed the belief of Vespucci and his companions that: "We knew that land to be not an island but continent, both from its long extending coasts which do not enclose it and from the infinite number of inhabitants which it contains". "Continent" meant, at that time, one of the three known continents, Europe, Africa and Asia, that adjoined each other (from Latin "continens"="touching") surrounded by the Ocean, which was divided by Africa into the Western, or Atlantic and Eastern, or Indian Oceans which contained the Earth's large and small islands. Vespucci's belief, therefore, was that the land was part of the continent of Asia.

It has been theorized that "continent" in the Mundus Novus meant the same as its modern meaning, that is, one of the Earth's main continuous land-masses, and that therefore it had first introduced to Europeans the idea that this was a new continent and not Asia, and that this led to Waldseemüller's separating the Americas from Asia, depicting the Pacific Ocean, and the use of the first name of Vespucci on his map.

An explanatory text, the Cosmographiae Introductio, widely believed to have been written by Waldseemüller's colleague Matthias Ringmann, accompanied the map.  It was said in Chapter IX of that text that the Earth was now known to be divided into four parts, of which Europe, Asia and Africa, being contiguous with each other, were one continent, while the fourth part, America, was "an island, inasmuch as it is found to be surrounded on all sides by the seas". This differed from the belief expressed by Vespucci in Quatuor Americi Vespucii Navigationes, published in the same book as an appendix, that the land he found was part of the continent of Asia: "After nineteen days we reached new land, which we took to be the mainland". The two contradictory views were published in the same book without explanation or comment.

The inscription on the top left corner of the map proclaims that the discovery of America by Columbus and Vespucci fulfilled a prophecy of the Roman poet, Virgil, made in the Aeneid (VI. 795–797), of a land to be found in the southern hemisphere, to the south of the Tropic of Capricorn:

The "path" referred to is the ecliptic, which marks the sun's yearly movement along the constellations of the zodiac, so that to go beyond it meant crossing the southernmost extent of the ecliptic, the Tropic of Capricorn. 19° beyond Capricorn is latitude 42° South, the southernmost extent of America shown on Waldseemüller's map. The map legend shows how Waldseemüller strove to reconcile the new geographic information with the knowledge inherited from antiquity.

The most southerly feature named on the coast of America on the Waldseemüller map is Rio decananorum, the "River of the Cananoreans". This was taken from Vespucci, who in 1501 during his voyage along this coast reached the port which he called Cananor (now Cananéia). Cananor was the port of Kannur in southern India, the farthest port reached in India during the 1500–1501 voyage of the Portuguese Pedro Álvares Cabral, the discoverer of Brazil, two of whose ships were encountered returning from India by Vespucci. This may be an indication Waldseemüller thought that the "River of the Cananoreans" could have actually been in the territory of Cananor in India and that America was, therefore, part of India.

The name for the northern land mass, Parias, is derived from a passage in the Four Voyages of Amerigo Vespucci, in which, after several stops, the expedition arrives at a region that was "situated in the torrid zone directly under the parallel which describes the Tropic of Cancer. And this province is called by them [the inhabitants] Parias." Parias was described by Waldseemüller's follower, Johannes Schöner as: "The island of Parias, which is not a part or portion of the foregoing [America] but a large, special part of the fourth part of the world", indicating uncertainty as to its situation.

PARIAS and AMERICA, corresponding to North and South America, are separated by a strait in the region of the present Panama on the main map but on the miniature map inset into the upper-mid part of the main map the isthmus joining the two is unbroken, apparently demonstrating Waldseemüller's willingness to represent alternative solutions to a question yet unanswered.

The map shows the cities of Catigara (near longitude 180° and latitude 10°S) and Mallaqua (Malacca, near longitude 170° and latitude 20°S) on the western coast of the great peninsula that projects from the southeastern part of Asia, or INDIA MERIDIONALIS (Southern India) as Waldseemüller called it. This peninsula forms the eastern side of the SINUS MAGNUS ("Great Gulf"), the Gulf of Thailand. Amerigo Vespucci, writing of his 1499 voyage, said he had hoped to sail westward from Spain across the Western Ocean (the Atlantic) around the Cape of Cattigara mentioned by Ptolemy into the Sinus Magnus.  Ptolemy understood Cattigara, or Kattigara, to be the most eastern port reached by shipping trading from the Graeco-Roman world to the lands of the Far East. Vespucci failed to find the Cape of Cattigara on his 1499 voyage: he sailed along the coast of Venezuela but not far enough to resolve the question of whether there was a sea passage beyond leading to Ptolemy's Sinus Magnus. The object of his voyage of 1503–1504 was to reach the fabulous spice emporium of "Melaccha in India" (that is, Malacca, or Melaka, on the Malay Peninsula). He had learned of Malacca from one Guaspare (or Gaspard), a pilot with Pedro Álvares Cabral's fleet on its voyage to India in 1500–1501, whom Vespucci had encountered in the Atlantic on his return from India in May 1501. Christopher Columbus, in his fourth and last voyage of 1502–1503, planned to follow the coast of Champa southward around the Cape of Cattigara and sail through the strait separating Cattigara from the New World, into the Sinus Magnus to Malacca. This was the route he understood Marco Polo to have gone from China to India in 1292 (although Malacca had not yet been founded in Polo's time). Columbus anticipated that he would meet up with the expedition sent at the same time from Portugal to Malacca around the Cape of Good Hope under Vasco da Gama, and carried letters of credence from the Spanish monarchs to present to da Gama. The map therefore shows the two cities that were the initial destinations of Amerigo Vespucci and Christopher Columbus in their voyages that led to the unexpected discovery of a New World.

Just to the south of Mallaqua (Malacca) is the inscription:  hic occisus est S. thomas (Here St. Thomas was killed), referring to the legend that Saint Thomas the Apostle went to India in 52 AD and was killed there in 72 AD. Waldseemüller had confused Malacca (Melaka) with Mylapore in India. The contemporary understanding of the nature of Columbus' discoveries is demonstrated in the letter written to him by the Aragonese cosmographer and Royal counsellor, Jaume Ferrer, dated 5 August 1495, saying: "Divine and infallible Providence sent the great Thomas from the Occident into the Orient in order to declare in India our Holy and Catholic Law; and you, Sir, it has sent to this opposite part of the Orient by way of the Ponient [West] so that by the Divine Will you might arrive in the Orient, and in the farthest parts of India Superior in order that the descendants might hear that which their ancestors neglected concerning the teaching of Thomas ... and very soon you will be by the Divine Grace in the Sinus Magnus, near which the glorious Thomas left his sacred body".

An inscription on the bottom right corner of the map explains that the map depicts the newly discovered parts of the world, added to those known from classical times:Although many of the ancients were most assiduous in describing the world, yet not a little remained unknown to them, such as, in the west, America, called by that name after its discoverer, which must be considered the Fourth part of the World. So, also, in the south, the African Part that begins at nearly seven degrees this side of Capricorn and extends very extensively southward beyond the Torrid Zone and Tropic of Capricorn. As also in the east, where the Region of Cathay and some portion of India Meridional are situated beyond longitude hundred and eighty degrees. We have added all these to what we formerly knew, so that lovers of these kinds of things may behold whatever of it at this day is opened to our eyes and approve our work. But one thing we ask, that those who are untaught in and ignorant of cosmography do not at once condemn before they have learned what will no doubt be dearer to them when later they understand it.

History
At the time this wall map was drawn, Waldseemüller was working as part of the group of scholars of the Vosgean Gymnasium at Saint-Dié-des-Vosges in Lorraine, which in that time belonged to the Holy Roman Empire. The maps were accompanied by the book Cosmographiae Introductio produced by the Vosgean Gymnasium.

Of the one thousand copies that were printed, only one complete copy of the original is known to exist today. It is, in fact, a reprint in the form of a printer's proof from after 1516 instead of 1507, date of the first edition, of which there is no extant example. It was owned by Johannes Schöner (1477–1547), a Nuremberg astronomer, geographer, and cartographer. Its existence was unknown for a long time until its rediscovery in 1901 in the library of Prince Johannes zu Waldburg-Wolfegg in Schloss Wolfegg in Württemberg, Germany by the Jesuit historian and cartographer Joseph Fischer. It remained there until 2001 when the United States Library of Congress purchased it from Waldburg-Wolfegg-Waldsee for ten million dollars.

Chancellor Angela Merkel of the Federal Republic of Germany symbolically turned over the Waldseemüller map on April 30, 2007, within the context of a formal ceremony at the Library of Congress, in Washington, DC. In her remarks, the chancellor stressed that the US contributions to the development of Germany in the postwar period tipped the scales in the decision to turn over the Waldseemüller map to the Library of Congress as a sign of transatlantic affinity and as an indication of the numerous German roots to the United States. Today another facsimile of the map is exhibited for the public by the House of Waldburg in their museum on Waldburg Castle in Upper Swabia.

Since 2007, to the celebration of the 500 year jubilee of the first edition, the original map has been permanently displayed in the Library of Congress, within a specially-designed microclimate case. An argon atmosphere fills the case to give an anoxic environment. Prior to display, the entire map was the subject of a scientific analysis project using hyperspectral imaging with an advanced LED camera and illumination system to address preservation storage and display issues.

In 2005 the Waldseemüller map was nominated by Librarian of Congress James H. Billington for inscription on UNESCO's Memory of the World Register and was inscribed on the register that same year.

Nunn's analysis
The geographers of Italy and Germany, like Martin Waldseemüller and his colleagues, were exponents of a theoretical geography, or cosmography. This means they appealed to theory where their knowledge of the American and Asiatic geography was lacking. That practice differed from the official Portuguese and Spanish cartographers, who omitted from their maps all unexplored coastlines.

The second century Alexandrian geographer Claudius Ptolemy had believed that the known world extended over 180 degrees of longitude from the prime meridian of the Fortunate Isles (possibly the Canary Islands) to the city of Cattigara in southeastern Asia. (In fact, the difference in longitude between the Canaries, at 16°W, and Cattigara, at 105°E, is just 121°.) He had also thought that the Indian Ocean was completely surrounded by land. Marco Polo demonstrated that an ocean lay east of Asia and was connected with the Indian Ocean. Hence, on the globe made by Martin Behaim in 1492, which combined the geography of Ptolemy with that of Marco Polo, the Indian Ocean was shown as merging with the Western Ocean to the east. Ptolemy's lands to the east of the Indian Ocean, however, were retained in the form of a great promontory projecting far south from the southeastern corner of Asia—the peninsula of Upper India (India Superior) upon which the city of Cattigara was situated.

Another result of Marco Polo's travels was also shown on Behaim's globe—the addition of 60 degrees to the longitude of Asia. Columbus had not actually seen Behaim's globe in 1492 (which apparently owed much to the ideas of Paolo dal Pozzo Toscanelli); but the globe, except for one important point, reflects the geographical theory on which he apparently based his plan for his first voyage. The exception is that Columbus shortened the length of the degree, thus reducing the distance from the Canaries to Zipangu (Japan), to about 62 degrees or only 775 leagues. Consequently, it seemed to Columbus a relatively simple matter to reach Asia by sailing west.

In the early 16th century, two theories prevailed with regard to America (the present South America). According to one theory, that continent was identified with the southeastern promontory of Asia that figures on Behaim's globe, India Superior or the Cape of Cattigara. The other view was that America (South America) was a huge island wholly unconnected with Asia.

Balboa called the Pacific the Mar del Sur and referred to it as "la otra mar", the other sea, by contrast with the Atlantic, evidently with Behaim's concept of only two oceans in mind. The Mar del Sur, the South Sea, was the part of the Indian Ocean to the south of Asia: the Indian Ocean was the Oceanus Orientalis, the Eastern Ocean, as opposed to the Atlantic or Western Ocean, the Oceanus Occidentalis in Behaim's two ocean world.

According to George E. Nunn, the key to Waldseemüller's apparent new ocean is found on the three sketch maps made by Bartolomé Colon (that is, Bartholomew Columbus, Christopher's brother) and Alessandro Zorzi in 1504 to demonstrate the geographical concepts of Christopher Columbus. One of the Columbus/Zorzi sketch maps bears an inscription saying that: "According to Marinus of Tyre and Columbus, from Cape St. Vincent to Cattigara is 225 degrees, which is 15 hours; according to Ptolemy as far as Cattigara 180 degrees, which is 12 hours". This shows that Christopher Columbus overestimated the distance eastward between Portugal and Cattigara as being 225 degrees instead of Ptolemy's estimate of 180 degrees, permitting him to believe the distance westward was only 135 degrees and therefore that the land he found was the East Indies. As noted by Nunn, in accordance with this calculation, the Colon/Zorzi maps employ the longitude estimate of Claudius Ptolemy from Cape St. Vincent eastward to Cattigara, but the longitude calculation of Marinus and Columbus is employed for the space between Cape St. Vincent westward to Cattigara.

Nunn pointed out that Martin Waldseemüller devised a scheme that showed both the Columbus and the Ptolemy-Behaim concept on the same map. As Waldseemüller himself said: "We have followed Ptolemy on the flat map, except for the new lands". On the right hand side of the Waldseemüller 1507 map is shown the Ptolemy-Behaim concept with the Ptolemy longitudes: this shows the huge peninsula of India Superior extending to the south of the Tropic of Capricorn. On the left side of the Waldseemüller map the discoveries of Columbus, Vespucci and others are represented as a long strip of land extending from about latitude 50 degree North to latitude 40 degrees South. The western coasts of these trans-Atlantic lands discovered under the Spanish crown are simply described by Waldseemüller as Terra Incognita (Unknown Land) or Terra Ulterior Incognita (Unknown Land Beyond), with a conjectural sea to the west, making these lands apparently a distinct continent. America's (that is, South America's) status as a separate island or a part of Asia, specifically, the peninsula of India Superior upon which Cattigara was situated, is left unresolved. As the question of which of the two alternative concepts was correct had not been resolved at the time, both were represented on the same map. Both extremities of the map represent the eastern extremity of Asia, according to the two alternative theories. As Nunn said, "This was a very plausible way of presenting a problem at the time insoluble."

As noted by Nunn, the distance between the meridians on the map is different going eastward and westward from the prime meridian which passes through the Fortunate Isles (Canary Islands). This has the effect of representing the eastern coast of Asia twice: once in accordance with Ptolemy's longitudes to show it as Martin Behaim had done on his 1492 globe; and again in accordance with Columbus' calculation of longitudes to show his and the other Spanish navigators' discoveries across the Western Ocean, which Columbus and his followers considered to be part of India Superior.

On his 1516 world map, the Carta Marina, Waldseemüller identified the land he had called Parias on his 1507 map as Terra de Cuba and said it was part of Asia (Asie partis); that is, he explicitly identified the land discovered by Columbus as the eastern part of Asia.

Globe gores

Besides Universalis Cosmographia, Waldseemüller published a set of gores for constructing globes. The gores, also containing the inscription America, are believed to have been printed in the same year as the wall map, since Waldseemüller mentions them in the introduction to his Cosmographiæ Introductio. On the globe gores, the sea to the west of the notional American west coast is named the Occeanus Occidentalis, that is, the Western or Atlantic Ocean, and where it merges with the Oceanus Orientalis (the Eastern, or Indian Ocean) is hidden by the latitude staff. This appears to indicate uncertainty as to America's location, whether it was an island continent in the Atlantic (Western Ocean) or in fact the great peninsula of India Superior shown on earlier maps, such as the 1489 map of the world by Martellus or the 1492 globe of Behaim.

Only few copies of the globe gores are extant. The first to be rediscovered was found in 1871 and is now in the James Ford Bell Library of the University of Minnesota. Another copy was found inside a Ptolemy atlas and had been in the Bavarian State Library in Munich since 1990. The Library recognized in February 2018, after reviewing its authenticity, that this map is not an original copy - it was printed in the 20th century.
 
A third copy was discovered in 1992 bound into an edition of Aristotle in the Stadtbücherei Offenburg, a public library in Germany. A fourth copy came to light in 2003 when its European owner read a newspaper article about the Waldseemüller map. It was sold at auction to Charles Frodsham & Co. for $1,002,267, a world record price for a single sheet map.
In July 2012, a statement was released from Ludwig Maximilian University of Munich that a fifth copy of the gore had been found in the LMU Library's collection which is somewhat different from the other copies, perhaps because of a later date of printing.
LMU Library has made an electronic version of their copy of the map available online.

See also
Ancient world maps
Caverio map, made in 1505.
History of cartography
Johannes Schöner globe, made in 1520.
List of most expensive books and manuscripts
Mappa mundi
Naming of the Americas
Piri Reis map
Theatrum Orbis Terrarum, considered to be the first true modern atlas.
World map

References

Further reading

Lester, Toby: "A world redrawn: When America showed up on a map, it was the universe that got transformed", Boston Globe, October 11, 2009
Lester, Toby, "Putting America on the Map", Smithsonian, Volume 40, Number 9, p. 78, December 2009
Lester, Toby: The Fourth Part of the World: An Astonishing Epic of Global Discovery, Imperial Ambition, and the Birth of America, Free Press, 2010, 496 p. .

Chet Van Duzer, "Waldseemüller's World Maps of 1507 and 1516: Sources and Development", The Portolan, No.1, Winter 2012, pp. 8–20.
Martin Lehmann, "The depiction of America on Martin Waldseemüller's world map from 1507 — Humanistic geography in the service of political propaganda", Cogent Arts & Humanities, 3 (1), 2016, DOI: 10.1080/23311983.2016.1152785
Martin Lehmann (ed.), Der Globus mundi Martin Waldseemüllers aus dem Jahre 1509: Text, Übersetzung, Kommentar, Berlin, Freiburg im Breisgau, Rombach Verlag, 2016.

External links

1507 Waldseemüller Map from the US Library of Congress
TOPS Lecture at Library of Congress, Drs. France and Easton
National Geographic News: US Buys Oldest Map Marked "America"
Martin Waldseemüller - Bell Library: Maps and Mapmakers
World Digital Library presentation of Universalis cosmographia secundum Ptholomaei traditionem et Americi Vespucii aliorum que lustrationes or A Map of the Entire World According to the Traditional Method of Ptolemy and Corrected with Other Lands of Amerigo Vespucci. Library of Congress.

1507 works
Historic maps of the world
World Digital Library
Memory of the World Register
16th-century maps and globes